Álvaro Mejía Pérez (born 18 January 1982) is a Spanish former professional footballer who played primarily as a central defender.

Club career
Born in Madrid, Mejía started his career at Las Rozas CF. He signed for Real Madrid in 1998, subsequently moving up the various youth ranks.

Mejía joined the third team for 2001–02 but moved shortly after to the reserves, being admitted to the main squad the following season and making his La Liga debut in a 2–1 home win against Villarreal CF on 24 January 2004. He also appeared in the UEFA Champions League's round of 16 on 3 March (again playing the full match) in a 1–0 home victory over FC Bayern Munich. In May he renewed his contract until 2010, and he was subsequently put to use in different defensive positions.

The following year, Mejía appeared in just eight games for Real Madrid in all competitions, adding 26 in the league over the next two seasons. His only goal came in a 2–0 away defeat of Real Betis on 29 October 2005 after one minute on the pitch, having come on as a substitute for Carlos Diogo.

In July 2007, Mejía joined top-flight newcomers Real Murcia on a four-year deal, and scored in the first league round in a 2–1 home win over Real Zaragoza. A starter throughout the vast majority of the campaign, he faced relegation for the first time in his career.

On 30 July 2010, after Murcia dropped another tier, Mejía moved to AC Arles-Avignon in France, newly promoted to Ligue 1, on a one-year contract. In January of the following year he changed teams – and countries – again, signing for Turkish Süper Lig club Konyaspor.

On 13 July 2012, Mejía agreed to a one-year deal with UD Almería in the Spanish second division, after passing his medical. On 18 June 2014, after one season in the Super League Greece with Ergotelis FC, he joined newly promoted Qatar Stars League side Al-Shahania SC.

Club statistics

Honours
Real Madrid
La Liga: 2006–07

Al-Shahania
Qatari Second Division: 2017–18

References

External links

1982 births
Living people
Spanish footballers
Footballers from Madrid
Association football defenders
La Liga players
Segunda División players
Segunda División B players
Real Madrid C footballers
Real Madrid Castilla footballers
Real Madrid CF players
Real Murcia players
UD Almería players
Ligue 1 players
AC Arlésien players
Süper Lig players
TFF First League players
Konyaspor footballers
Super League Greece players
Ergotelis F.C. players
Qatar Stars League players
Qatari Second Division players
Al-Shahania SC players
Spanish expatriate footballers
Expatriate footballers in France
Expatriate footballers in Turkey
Expatriate footballers in Greece
Expatriate footballers in Qatar
Spanish expatriate sportspeople in France
Spanish expatriate sportspeople in Turkey
Spanish expatriate sportspeople in Greece
Spanish expatriate sportspeople in Qatar